The 2022 Slovak Open was a professional tennis tournament played on hard courts. It was the 24th edition of the tournament which was part of the 2022 ATP Challenger Tour and the ninth edition of the tournament which was part of the 2022 ITF Women's World Tennis Tour. It took place in Bratislava, Slovakia between 7 and 20 November 2022.

Champions

Men's singles

  Márton Fucsovics def.  Fábián Marozsán 6–2, 6–4.

Women's singles

  Ana Konjuh def.  Nigina Abduraimova, 2–6, 6–0, 7–6(7–2)

Men's doubles

  Denys Molchanov /  Aleksandr Nedovyesov def.  Petr Nouza /  Andrew Paulson 4–6, 6–4, [10–6].

Women's doubles

  Jesika Malečková /  Renata Voráčová def.  Katarína Kužmová /  Viktória Kužmová, 2–6, 7–5, [13–11]

Men's singles main-draw entrants

Seeds

 1 Rankings are as of 31 October 2022.

Other entrants
The following players received wildcards into the singles main draw:
  Jakub Menšík
  Lukáš Pokorný
  Peter Benjamín Privara

The following players received entry from the qualifying draw:
  Viktor Durasovic
  Cem İlkel
  Illya Marchenko
  Hamad Međedović
  Henri Squire
  Stefano Travaglia

Women's singles main-draw entrants

Seeds

 1 Rankings are as of 7 November 2022.

Other entrants
The following players received wildcards into the singles main draw:
  Irina Balus
  Nikola Daubnerová
  Renáta Jamrichová
  Nina Vargová

The following player received entry into the singles main draw using a protected ranking:
  Maia Lumsden

The following players received entry from the qualifying draw:
  Freya Christie
  Denisa Hindová
  Anika Jašková
  Bojana Klincov
  Aneta Kučmová
  Katarína Kužmová
  Eszter Méri
  Amarissa Kiara Tóth

The following player received entry as a lucky loser:
  Mia Ristić

References

External links
 2022 Slovak Open at ITFtennis.com
 Official website (men)
 Official website (women)

2022 ATP Challenger Tour
2022 ITF Women's World Tennis Tour
2022
November 2022 sports events in Europe